Deweyville may refer to:
 Deweyville, California, former name of Wasco, California
 Deweyville, Ohio
 Deweyville, Texas
 Deweyville, Utah